Abdullah Bakhashab (born 26 September 1968) is a Saudi Arabian rally driver who competed in the WRC between 1998 and 2002. He started his rally career in 1992 and scored his first points at the 2000 Acropolis Rally. He also won the 1995 Middle East Rally Championship title.

External links
 eWRC results

1968 births
Living people
Saudi Arabian rally drivers
World Rally Championship drivers